Gaius Cassius Longinus was consul in 96 BC with Gnaeus Domitius Ahenobarbus. He stood for the plebeian tribunate in 104 BC but was unsuccessful; after his consulship, he may have been the Gaius Cassius which was to assume supreme command against the Marians in the Bellum Octavianum. 

He is mentioned by Cicero as one of those persons elected consul without previously holding the aedileship.

References 
 Citations

 Sources
 
 

1st-century BC Roman consuls
Longinus, Gaius